Albert Lomotey (born 25 August 1955) is a Ghanaian sprinter.

He participated at the 1974 British Commonwealth  Games in Christchurch, winning a silver medal.  He also participated at the 1978 Commonwealth Games in Edmonton.

His personal bests are:
 100 metres: 10.0 (hand time), in College Park, Maryland (USA)	15 MAY 1977;
 200 metres: 20.91 (-0.7 m/s), in Montreal (CAN)	27 July 1975

References

External links
IAAF Athlete’s profile

1955 births
Living people
Ghanaian male sprinters
Place of birth missing (living people)
Commonwealth Games medallists in athletics
Commonwealth Games silver medallists for Ghana
African Games medalists in athletics (track and field)
African Games gold medalists for Ghana
Athletes (track and field) at the 1978 All-Africa Games
Athletes (track and field) at the 1974 British Commonwealth Games
Athletes (track and field) at the 1978 Commonwealth Games
Medallists at the 1974 British Commonwealth Games